Yan Xiangchuang (born September 5, 1986 in Dalian, Liaoning) is a Chinese international professional footballer who currently plays for Dalian Professional in the Chinese Super League.

Club career
After graduating through the Bayi youth team he would move to Beijing Guoan in 2004 to begin his professional football career. He eventually made his senior debut on May 26, 2004 against Shenyang Ginde. A squad player at first he would show his attacking instincts when he scored his debut league goal against Inter Shanghai on September 11, 2005 in a 3-1 victory. After playing in several attacking positions within the team he was moved to the right wing where his pace and attacking instincts would see him establish himself as an integral member of the team. 

After helping Beijing progress each season higher within the league he would eventually help the team win the 2009 league title. The following season saw Yan unable to replicate the same success he had with the team and the club brought in Honduras international Walter Julián Martínez into the club. Martínez would go on to establish himself as the team's first choice right midfielder and during the 2011 league season Yan was allowed to go on loan to his home town of Dalian and join Dalian Shide for the rest of the season.

On 3 July 2014, Yan transferred to Chinese Super League side Harbin Yiteng. He would make his debut in a league game on 20 July 2014 against  Guizhou Moutai in a 4-0 victory. Unfortunately he would be part of the squad that was relegated at the end of 2014 Chinese Super League campaign.

On 5 February 2015, Yan transferred to China League One side Beijing Enterprises Group. He would establish himself as an integral member of the team for the next several seasons until his contract expired and on 21 April 2022 he joined top tier club Dalian Professional for the start of the 2022 Chinese Super League season. He made  his debut in a league game on 4 June 2022 against Henan Songshan Longmen in a match that ended in a 2-2 draw.

International career
Yan Xiangchuang would be called up to the Chinese national team and would make his debut in a friendly against Tajikistan on June 26, 2010 in a 4-0 victory where he would also score in his debut.

Career statistics

Club statistics
.

Honours
Beijing Guoan
Chinese Super League: 2009

References

External links
 Player profile at Beijing Guoan website 
 Player profile at Sodasoccer.com 
 Player stats at Sohu.com 
 
 
 Yan Xiangchuang's Blog 

1986 births
Living people
Association football forwards
Chinese footballers
Footballers from Dalian
China international footballers
Bayi Football Team players
Beijing Guoan F.C. players
Dalian Shide F.C. players
Dalian Professional F.C. players
Beijing Renhe F.C. players
Zhejiang Yiteng F.C. players
Beijing Sport University F.C. players
Chinese Super League players
China League One players